Luke White, 2nd Baron Annaly KP (26 September 1829 – 16 March 1888), was an Anglo-Irish Liberal politician.

Annaly was the son of Henry White, 1st Baron Annaly, and his wife Ellen (née Dempster), and was educated at Eton. He served in the British Army and achieved the rank of captain in the 13th Light Dragoons and Lieutenant-Colonel in the Longford Rifles. In 1859 he was returned to Parliament for County Clare however unseated by petition the following year, and then represented County Longford from 1861 to 1862 and Kidderminster from 1862 to 1865. Annaly served in the Liberal administration of Lord Palmerston as a Junior Lord of the Treasury between 1862 and 1866. From 1868 to 1873 he was State Steward to the Lord-Lieutenant of Ireland the Earl Spencer. He also held the honorary positions of Sheriff of County Dublin in 1861 and of County Longford in 1871 and Lord-Lieutenant of County Longford from 1873 to 1874. In 1885 he was made a Knight of the Order of St Patrick.

Lord Annaly died in March 1888, aged 58, and was succeeded in the barony by his eldest son Luke. Lady Annaly died in 1915.

Family
Lord Annaly married Emily, daughter of James Stuart, in 1853. Their English home was Titness Park near Cheapside in Sunninghill, Berkshire. They had five sons and three daughters. All his sons had military careers, his third son Robert notably achieving the rank of Brigadier-General in the 184th Infantry Brigade.

His daughter Violet married Major Lord Percy St. Maur (in previous generations also spelt Seymour), second son of Algernon St Maur, 14th Duke of Somerset – this and the related Northumberland and Norfolk dukedoms form the main instance of a pre-Tudor major landowning dynasty which has survived.

References
Kidd, Charles, Williamson, David (editors). Debrett's Peerage and Baronetage (1990 edition). New York: St Martin's Press, 1990.

www.thepeerage.com

External links 

1829 births
1888 deaths
People educated at Eton College
19th-century Irish people
Members of the Parliament of the United Kingdom for County Longford constituencies (1801–1922)
Politicians from County Dublin
Knights of St Patrick
Lord-Lieutenants of Longford
White, Luke
White, Luke
White, Luke
UK MPs who inherited peerages
High Sheriffs of County Dublin
High Sheriffs of Longford
People from Sunninghill
Eldest sons of British hereditary barons
Luke 2